Yousuf Al-Abdulla (born 26 February 1985) is a Qatari handball player for Al-Gharafa and the Qatari national team.

He participated at the 2017 World Men's Handball Championship.

References

1985 births
Living people
Qatari male handball players
Asian Games gold medalists for Qatar
Asian Games medalists in handball
Medalists at the 2014 Asian Games
Handball players at the 2014 Asian Games